Klenovka is a rural locality (a selo) and the administrative center of Klenovskoye Selsoviet, Bolshesosnovsky District, Perm Krai, Russia. The population was 341 as of 2010. There are 5 streets.

Geography 
Klenovka is located 22 km northwest of Bolshaya Sosnova (the district's administrative centre) by road. Malye Kizeli is the nearest rural locality.

References 

Rural localities in Bolshesosnovsky District